Charles Barbant (15 July 1844, Paris - 10 May 1921, Paris) was a French wood engraver and illustrator.

Biography 
His father was the engraver, Nicolas Barbant (1806-1879), from whom he received his first lessons. After having worked for the engraver Jean Best (1808-1879) at the "Atelier ABL", from 1863 to 1866, he became an associate of his father. In 1871, he married Louise Angélina Gauchard; daughter of the wood engraver, Félix-Jean Gauchard (1825-1872). Following her death in 1894, he married one of his students, .

His workshop was one of the largest in Paris; specializing in wood engraving for multiple reproductions; generally in the form of a stamp. Between 1869 and 1882, he was part of a group providing illustrations for the works of Jules Verne; together with illustrators such as Léon Benett, Jules Férat, Henri de Montaut, Édouard Riou and George Roux.

His son, Auguste, also became an engraver and his daughter, Blanche, married the Brazilian illustrator, Henrique Alvim Corrêa. His daughter from his first marriage, Jeanne Paule Julie, married the composer, .

In addition to the illustrations for Verne, he made wood-engravings from drawings by Gustave Doré.

References

External links 
 
 

1844 births
1921 deaths
French engravers
French wood engravers
French illustrators
Artists from Paris